Adalgott II of Disentis (died 1165) was a twelfth-century monk and bishop. He entered Clairvaux Abbey as a monk, and was appointed as abbot of Disentis. Adalgott cared for the sick and poor. He was subsequently named bishop of Chur, and continued to care for the poor. He founded a hospital in 1150. He is venerated as a Roman Catholic saint. His feast day is celebrated on 3 October.

See also
List of Catholic saints

References

External links
St. Adalgott
St. Adalgott

 
German Roman Catholic saints
1165 deaths
12th-century Christian saints
Year of birth unknown
Bishops of Chur